The following are the national records in Olympic weightlifting in the Netherlands. Records are maintained in each weight class for the snatch lift, clean and jerk lift, and the total for both lifts by the Dutch Weightlifting Association (Nederlandse Gewichthefbond).

Men
Key to tables:

Women

References
General
Dutch records 31 October 2022 updated
Specific

External links
Dutch Weightlifting Association

Records
Netherlands
Olympic weightlifting
Weightlifting